The 2010 Stanley Cup playoffs of the National Hockey League (NHL) began on April 14, 2010, after the 2009–10 NHL regular season. The Finals ended on June 9, 2010, with the Chicago Blackhawks defeating the Philadelphia Flyers in six games to win their fourth championship and their first since 1961. Blackhawks center and team captain Jonathan Toews was awarded the Conn Smythe Trophy as the playoffs' most valuable player.

The Washington Capitals made the playoffs as the Presidents' Trophy winners with the most points (i.e. best record) during the regular season. The Detroit Red Wings increased their postseason appearance streak to nineteen seasons, the longest active streak at the time.

This NHL post-season was noted for the unexpected playoff successes of two teams: the Philadelphia Flyers and Montreal Canadiens, who were the seventh and eighth seeds in their conference and were tied for points. The Flyers became the third NHL team to win a seven-game series after being down 3–0 (the others being the 1942 Toronto Maple Leafs and the 1975 New York Islanders). The Flyers went on to play in the Stanley Cup Finals, losing to Chicago. Meanwhile, the Canadiens became the first eighth-seeded team in NHL history to win a series against the first-seeded team after being down 3–1 in a series, when they beat the Washington Capitals in the first round. After upsetting the defending Cup champions Pittsburgh Penguins in the second round, the Canadiens became the first eighth-seeded team to compete in the Eastern Conference Final since the current playoff format was implemented in 1994. Previously, only the eighth-seeded 2006 Edmonton Oilers had accomplished a similar feat, winning the 2006 Western Conference Final. As a result of the Canadiens having the eighth seed, the Flyers became the first seventh-seed to have home-ice advantage in the conference finals since the current playoff format was instituted.

Playoff seeds
The top eight teams in each conference qualified for the playoffs. The top three seeds in each conference were awarded to the division winners; while the five remaining spots were awarded to the highest finishers in their respective conferences.

Eastern Conference
Washington Capitals, Southeast Division champions, Eastern Conference regular season champions, President's Trophy winners – 121 points
New Jersey Devils, Atlantic Division champions – 103 points
Buffalo Sabres, Northeast Division champions – 100 points
Pittsburgh Penguins – 101 points
Ottawa Senators – 94 points
Boston Bruins – 91 points
Philadelphia Flyers – 88 points (41 wins)
Montreal Canadiens – 88 points (39 wins)

Western Conference
San Jose Sharks, Pacific Division champions, Western Conference regular season champions – 113 points
Chicago Blackhawks, Central Division champions – 112 points
Vancouver Canucks, Northwest Division champions – 103 points
Phoenix Coyotes – 107 points
Detroit Red Wings – 102 points
Los Angeles Kings – 101 points
Nashville Predators – 100 points
Colorado Avalanche – 95 points

Playoff bracket 
In each round, the highest remaining seed in each conference was matched against the lowest remaining seed. The higher-seeded team was awarded home ice advantage. In the Stanley Cup Finals, home ice was awarded to the team with the better regular season record. Each best-of-seven series followed a 2–2–1–1–1 format: the higher-seeded team played at home for games one and two (plus five and seven if necessary), and the lower-seeded team was at home for games three and four (and if necessary, game six).

Conference Quarterfinals

Eastern Conference Quarterfinals

(1) Washington Capitals vs. (8) Montreal Canadiens

The Washington Capitals entered the playoffs as the Presidents' Trophy winner, earning the NHL's best regular season record with 121 points. The Montreal Canadiens qualified for the playoffs as the eighth seed with 88 points, losing the tiebreaker over Philadelphia on total wins (41 to 39). This was the first and to date only playoff meeting between these two teams. The teams split this year's four-game regular season series.

Montreal's point difference in the series was the fifth largest point differential (33 points) for a lower-seeded team beating a higher-seeded team in playoff history. It was also the first time an eighth-seeded team came back against a number one seed after being down 3–1 in the series. Montreal goaltender Jaroslav Halak made 45 saves and Tomas Plekanec won game one for the Canadiens with his goal 13:19 into the first overtime period. Washington forward Nicklas Backstrom scored the overtime winner in game two and completed a hat-trick with his goal 31 seconds into the first overtime period to give Washington a 6–5 win; Andrei Kostitsyn also scored a hat-trick during this game in a losing effort for the Canadiens. After a scoreless opening period in game three, the Capitals scored four times in the second period as they earned a 5–1 victory. Washington forward Alexander Ovechkin recorded three points as the Capitals won game four 6–3. Jaroslav Halak returned in game five for Montreal after sitting out the previous game and posted 37 saves as the Canadiens avoided elimination with a 2–1 win. Michael Cammalleri scored twice in the opening period of game six for Montreal and Jaroslav Halak made 53 saves as the Canadiens forced a seventh-game with a 4–1 victory. Montreal forward Dominic Moore scored the series-clinching goal late in the third period of game seven as the Canadiens hung on to a 2–1 decision.

(2) New Jersey Devils vs. (7) Philadelphia Flyers

The New Jersey Devils entered the playoffs as the second overall seed in the Eastern Conference after winning the Atlantic Division with 103 points. The Philadelphia Flyers qualified as the seventh seed with 88 points, winning the tiebreaker over Montreal on total wins (41 to 39). This was the fifth playoff meeting between these two teams, with the teams splitting the four previous series. They last met in the 2004 Eastern Conference Quarterfinals where Philadelphia won in five games. Philadelphia won five of the six games during this year's regular season series.

The Flyers upset the Devils in five games. Philadelphia goaltender Brian Boucher made 23 saves in game one as the Flyers took the opening game 2–1. Devils forward Dainius Zubrus broke the tie in game two with just over four minutes remaining in the game as New Jersey evened the series with 5–3 victory. Daniel Carcillo scored the overtime winner for the Flyers in a 3–2 win in game three. Brian Boucher made 30 saves and Jeff Carter added two goals in game four as the Flyers pushed New Jersey to the brink of elimination with a 4–1 triumph. Philadelphia ended the series in game five with a 3–0 shutout; Boucher made 28 saves in the victory.

(3) Buffalo Sabres vs. (6) Boston Bruins

The Buffalo Sabres entered the playoffs as the third overall seed in the Eastern Conference after winning the Northeast Division title with 100 points. The Boston Bruins qualified as the sixth seed with 91 points. This was the eighth playoff meeting between these two teams, with Boston winning five of the seven previous series. They last met in the 1999 Eastern Conference Semifinals where Buffalo won in six games. Boston won four of the six games during this year's regular season series.

The Bruins eliminated the Sabres in six games. Buffalo goaltender Ryan Miller made 38 saves as the Sabres took the opening game of the series. Michael Ryder and Zdeno Chara each scored twice in game two as the Bruins overcame a one-goal deficit entering the third period, taking the game 5–3. Boston broke the tie in game three with a goal from Patrice Bergeron with just over seven minutes remaining in regulation time. Buffalo squandered a two-goal lead in third period of game four as the Bruins forced overtime; at 7:41 of the second overtime period Miroslav Satan scored the game-winning goal for Boston, giving them a 3–1 series lead. The Sabres extended the series in game five with a 4–1 victory; at the end of the game, five players were assessed penalties after an altercation including Boston captain Zdeno Chara who was given an instigator penalty. As the penalty occurred in the final five minutes of the game Chara should have been suspended for game six, but the league rescinded the instigator penalty after the game, allowing Chara to avoid suspension. Miroslav Satan scored the series-winning goal in game six as Boston held on to a 4–3 win.

(4) Pittsburgh Penguins vs. (5) Ottawa Senators

The Pittsburgh Penguins entered the playoffs as the fourth seed in the Eastern Conference with 101 points. The Ottawa Senators qualified as the fifth seed with 94 points. This was the third playoff meeting between these two teams, with the teams splitting the two previous series. They last met in the 2008 Eastern Conference Quarterfinals where Pittsburgh won in four games. The teams split this year's four-game regular season series.

The Penguins defeated the Senators in six games. Ottawa forward Jarkko Ruutu scored the game-winning goal in game one as the Senators took the opening game 5–4. Penguins captain Sidney Crosby had a goal and an assist as Pittsburgh evened the series with a 2–1 win. Evgeni Malkin broke the tie for the Penguins early in the second period of game three as they took the series lead with a 4–2 victory. Ottawa goaltender Brian Elliott was pulled in the second period of game four after allowing four goals; the Penguins won the game 7–4. Ottawa avoided elimination in game five thanks to a 56 save effort by Pascal Leclaire; Matt Carkner scored the game-winning goal at 7:06 of the third overtime period. Pittsburgh overcame a three-goal deficit in game six to force overtime, where Pascal Dupuis ended the series at 9:56 of the first overtime as the Penguins advanced past the opening round of the playoffs for the third straight year.

Western Conference Quarterfinals

(1) San Jose Sharks vs. (8) Colorado Avalanche

The San Jose Sharks entered the playoffs as the Western Conference regular season champions with 113 points. The Colorado Avalanche qualified as the eighth seed with 95 points. This was the fourth playoff meeting between these two teams with Colorado winning two of the previous three series. They last met in the 2004 Western Conference Semifinals where San Jose won in six games. San Jose won this year's four-game regular season series earning five of eight points.

The Sharks eliminated the Avalanche in six games. Chris Stewart scored for the Avalanche in the final minute of game one as they took the opening game 2–1. Sharks forward Joe Pavelski tied game two in the final minute of regulation time before Devin Setoguchi scored the game-winner on the power-play 5:22 into the first overtime period; evening the series at one game each. Colorado goaltender Craig Anderson made 51 saves and Ryan O'Reilly was credited with scoring the overtime winner after San Jose defenceman Dan Boyle scored on his own goal as the Avalanche won game three 1–0. For the third consecutive time in the series overtime was required to solve game four as Joe Pavelski won the game for the Sharks with his goal 10:24 into the first overtime period. Evgeni Nabokov made 28 saves to earn a shutout as the Sharks easily won game five 5–0. After falling behind early in the third period of game six San Jose scored four unanswered goals to close out the series with a 5–2 victory.

(2) Chicago Blackhawks vs. (7) Nashville Predators

The Chicago Blackhawks entered the playoffs as the second overall seed in the Western Conference after winning the Central Division title with 112 points. The Nashville Predators qualified as the seventh seed with 100 points. This was the first playoff meeting between these two teams. Chicago won four of the six games during this year's regular season series.

The Blackhawks defeated the Predators in six games. Nashville scored four times in the third period of game one to earn their franchise's first-ever road playoff victory; they had lost all of their ten previous playoff road games. Blackhawks goaltender Antti Niemi made 23 saves in a 2–0 shutout in game two, as Chicago evened the series. After trading goals in the opening period of game three, the Predators struck three times in the final 40 minutes including a penalty shot goal by Martin Erat. Antti Niemi earned his second shutout of the series in game four as Chicago took the game 3–0. The Blackhawks tied game five late in the third period on a short-handed goal by Patrick Kane and Marian Hossa ended the game 4:07 into overtime, ten seconds after he finished serving a major penalty for boarding. Chicago captain Jonathan Toews capped the scoring in the first period of game six; that saw the teams exchange seven goals. The Blackhawks held on to win the series-clinching game 5–3.

(3) Vancouver Canucks vs. (6) Los Angeles Kings

The Vancouver Canucks entered the playoffs as the third overall seed in the Western Conference after winning the Northwest Division title with 103 points. The Los Angeles Kings qualified as the sixth seed with 101 points, earning their first playoff berth since 2002. This was the fourth playoff meeting between these two teams, with Los Angeles winning two of the three previous series. They last met in the 1993 Smythe Division Finals where Los Angeles won in six games. Vancouver won three of the four games during this year's regular season series.

The Canucks eliminated the Kings in six games. Mikael Samuelsson scored twice for the Canucks in game one including the overtime winner 8:52 into the first overtime period as Vancouver took the opening game 3–2. The Kings evened the series in game two when Anze Kopitar scored the game-winning goal in the first overtime period at 7:28. Los Angeles chased Vancouver starter Roberto Luongo from game three after he allowed four goals against on sixteen shots, the Kings held on to win 5–3. Vancouver forward Henrik Sedin broke the tie in game four with 2:52 remaining in regulation time as the Canucks evened the series with a 6–4 victory. Mikael Samuelsson extended his goal scoring streak to five games as the Canucks easily won game five 7–2. Canucks goaltender Roberto Luongo made 30 saves in game six and Daniel Sedin scored the series-winner for Vancouver late in the third period of a 4–2 win.

(4) Phoenix Coyotes vs. (5) Detroit Red Wings

The Phoenix Coyotes entered the playoffs as the fourth seed in the Western Conference with 107 points. The Detroit Red Wings qualified as the fifth seed with 102 points. This was the third playoff meeting between these two teams, with Detroit winning both previous series. They last met in the 1998 Western Conference Quarterfinals where Detroit won in six games. Detroit won this year's four-game regular season series earning six of eight points.

The Red Wings defeated the Coyotes in seven games. Phoenix went three for four on the power-play in game one as they took the opening game by a final score of 3–2. Red Wings forward Henrik Zetterberg scored a hat trick in game two as Detroit evened the series with a 7–4 win. Petr Prucha scored the game-winning goal for the Coyotes in game three as Phoenix took the game with a 4–2 victory. Detroit goaltender Jimmy Howard made 29 saves to shut out the Coyotes in game four as the Red Wings tied the series with a 3–0 win. The Red Wings broke the tie in game five just past the midway mark of the third period with two goals scored 70 seconds apart and held on to win 4–1. Phoenix forced a seventh game with a dominant special teams performance in game six recording three power-play goals in the victory. After a scoreless first period in game seven, the Red Wings scored four times in the second period en route to a 6–1 win.

Conference Semifinals

Eastern Conference Semifinals

(4) Pittsburgh Penguins vs. (8) Montreal Canadiens

This was the second playoff meeting between these two teams, with Montreal winning the previous series. They last met in the 1998 Eastern Conference Quarterfinals where Montreal won in six games. Pittsburgh won three of the four games during this year's four-game regular season series.

The Canadiens defeated the Penguins in seven games. Pittsburgh scored four times on the power-play in game one as they took the opening game 6–3. Michael Cammalleri scored twice for Montreal in game two and Jaroslav Halak made 38 saves as the Canadiens evened the series with a 3–1 win. Pittsburgh forward Evgeni Malkin's fifth goal of the playoffs broke a scoreless tie in the third period of game three as the Penguins earned a 2–0 victory; Marc-Andre Fleury made 18 saves to shut-out the Canadiens. Jaroslav Halak made 33 saves for Montreal in game four as Montreal won the game 3–2. In game five, Penguins goaltender Marc-Andre Fleury made 32 saves in a 2–1 victory. Montreal forward Maxim Lapierre scored the game-winning goal in game six as the Canadiens won their fourth consecutive elimination game of the playoffs. Montreal's Brian Gionta scored twice on the power-play in game seven as the Canadiens eliminated the defending Stanley Cup champions with a 5–2 win. Game seven was the last game ever to be played at Mellon Arena, the Penguins' home rink since the start of the franchise. Incidentally, the Canadiens were the winners of the first game played against the Penguins at Mellon Arena in 1967. The Penguins moved into the Consol Energy Center starting the next season.

(6) Boston Bruins vs. (7) Philadelphia Flyers

This was the fifth playoff meeting between these two teams, with the teams splitting the four previous series. They last met in the 1978 Stanley Cup Semifinals where Boston won in five games. The teams split this year's four-game regular season series, including a 2–1 overtime win by Boston at the 2010 NHL Winter Classic at Fenway Park on New Year's Day.

Philadelphia became the third NHL team to come back from a 3–0 deficit to win a series, joining the 1942 Toronto Maple Leafs and the 1975 New York Islanders as the only teams to accomplish this feat (the 2014 Los Angeles Kings became the fourth team to do this in 2014). Bruins forward Marc Savard ended game one with his goal 13:52 into the first overtime period, giving Boston a 5–4 victory. Milan Lucic broke the tie late in the third period of game two to give the Bruins a 3–2 win. Boston goaltender Tuukka Rask made 34 saves in a 4–1 Bruins win during game three. In game four, Bruins forward Mark Recchi tied the game in the final minute of the third period, however the Bruins came up short in overtime as Simon Gagne extended the series with a goal 14:40 into the first overtime period in a 5–4 Flyers victory. Brian Boucher and Michael Leighton made 23 saves in a 4–0 split shutout for the Flyers in game five; Boucher was injured in the second period and did not return to the game. The Flyers forced a seventh game with a 2–1 victory in game six. In game seven, Philadelphia came back from a 3–0 goal deficit to win by a score of 4–3.

Western Conference Semifinals

(1) San Jose Sharks vs. (5) Detroit Red Wings

This was the fourth playoff meeting between these two teams, with Detroit winning two of the three previous series. They last met in the 2007 Western Conference Semifinals where Detroit won in six games. Detroit won three of the four games during this year's regular season series.

The Sharks eliminated the Red Wings in five games. San Jose scored three times in less than 90 seconds in the first period of game one, as they held on late to a 4–3 victory. After trading goals in the first period of game two, Detroit took the lead in the second period before San Jose came back in the third period, getting the game-winning goal from Joe Thornton at 12:37. The Sharks forced overtime in game three after coming back from a two-goal deficit in the third period, Patrick Marleau scored the overtime-winner for San Jose at 7:07 of the first overtime period. Detroit forward Johan Franzen scored a natural hat trick in the first period of game four and he scored again in the third period to cap off a four goal, six point night as the Red Wings extended the series with a 7–1 victory. No other player would score four times in a playoff game again until Jean-Gabriel Pageau scored four goals for the Ottawa Senators in a 6–5 overtime victory in game two of the 2017 Eastern Conference Second Round series against the New York Rangers. San Jose goaltender Evgeni Nabokov made 33 saves in the series-clinching win during game five.

(2) Chicago Blackhawks vs. (3) Vancouver Canucks

This was the fourth playoff meeting between these two teams, with Chicago winning two of the three previous series. They last met in the previous year's Western Conference Semifinals where Chicago won in six games. The teams split this year's four-game regular season series.

The Blackhawks defeated the Canucks in six games for the second consecutive year in the second round. Five different Vancouver players scored in game one and Roberto Luongo made 36 saves in the opening game victory. Kris Versteeg's first goal of the playoffs broke the tie in game two with 1:30 remaining in regulation time as the Blackhawks evened the series with a 4–2 win. Chicago forward Dustin Byfuglien scored a hat trick in game three as the Blackhawks won 5–2. In game four Blackhawks captain Jonathan Toews recorded a hat trick of his own (scoring all three goals on the power-play) as Chicago broke the game open in the second period and won by a final score of 7–4. Kevin Bieksa scored twice for the Canucks in game five as Vancouver avoided elimination with a 4–1 victory. After a scoreless opening period in game six the Blackhawks struck three times in the second period and held on to win the game 5–1, earning their second consecutive trip to the Western Conference Final.

Conference Finals

Eastern Conference Final

(7) Philadelphia Flyers vs. (8) Montreal Canadiens

This was the sixth playoff meeting between these two teams with Montreal winning three of the five previous series. They last met in the 2008 Eastern Conference Semifinals which Philadelphia won in five games. This was Philadelphia's ninth appearance in the Conference Finals. They last went to the Conference Finals in 2008, which they lost to the Pittsburgh Penguins in five games. This was Montreal's sixth Conference Finals appearance. They last went to the Conference Finals in 1993; which they won in five games over the New York Islanders. The teams split this year's four-game regular season series. Since adopting a conference based playoff seeding format in the 1993–94 NHL season this was the first Conference Final contested by the seventh and eighth seeds.

The Flyers defeated the Canadiens in five games. Michael Leighton made 28 saves in game one to earn a shutout as Philadelphia took the opener 6–0. The Flyers scored twice on the power-play in game two and Leighton shutout the Canadiens again in a 3–0 win. After being shutout in the first two games of the series Montreal scored five times in game three to earn a victory. In game four, Michael Leighton earned his third shutout of the series as the Flyers took a 3–1 series lead with another 3–0 win.  Flyers forward Jeff Carter scored the series-winning goal in the second period of game five and added an empty net goal in the third period to seal the game as Philadelphia advanced to the Stanley Cup Finals for the first time since .

Western Conference Final

(1) San Jose Sharks vs. (2) Chicago Blackhawks

This was the first playoff meeting between these two teams. This was San Jose's second appearance in the Conference Finals. They last went to the Conference Finals in 2004, which they lost to the Calgary Flames in six games. This was Chicago's ninth Conference Finals appearance. They last went to the Conference Finals in the previous year; which they lost in five games to the Detroit Red Wings. Chicago won three of the four games during this year's regular season series.

The Blackhawks swept the Sharks in four games. Blackhawks goaltender Antti Niemi made 44 saves in game one as Chicago took the opening game 2–1. Chicago had a three-goal lead halfway through the second period of game two and held on to win the game by a final score of 4–2. The Sharks came back to tie the game in the third period of game three thanks to Patrick Marleau’s second goal of the game, however San Jose came up short in overtime as Dustin Byfuglien ended the game at 12:24 of the first overtime period, giving Chicago a 3–0 series lead. Chicago trailed by two goals near the halfway mark of the second period before scoring four unanswered goals to complete the sweep in game four and they advanced to the Stanley Cup Finals for the first time in eighteen years.

Stanley Cup Finals

This was the second playoff series between these two teams and the first since 1971 when the Blackhawks swept the Flyers in four games in the Stanley Cup quarterfinals. Philadelphia won the only meeting between these teams in the regular season. Having lost in the 2010 Finals, the Flyers became the third team in NHL history to lose in six consecutive Finals appearances, after the Toronto Maple Leafs and the Detroit Red Wings.

Player statistics

Skaters
These are the top ten skaters based on points. If the list exceeds ten skaters because of a tie in points, goals take precedence.

GP = Games played; G = Goals; A = Assists; Pts = Points; +/– = Plus/minus

Goaltending
This is a combined table of the top five goaltenders based on goals against average and the top five goaltenders based on save percentage with at least 420 minutes played. The table is sorted by GAA, and the criteria for inclusion are bolded.

GP = Games played; W = Wins; L = Losses; SA = Shots against; GA = Goals against; GAA = Goals against average; SV% = Save percentage; SO = Shutouts; TOI = Time on ice (minutes:seconds)

Television
National Canadian English-language coverage of the first three rounds of the playoffs were split between CBC and TSN. CBC held exclusive rights to the Stanley Cup Finals. French-language telecasts were broadcast on RDS and RDS2.

In the United States, national coverage was split between NBC and Versus. During the first and second round, excluding games exclusively broadcast on NBC, the regional rights holders of each participating U.S. team produced local telecasts of their respective games. Not all first and second round games were nationally televised, while the Conference Finals were exclusively broadcast on either NBC or Versus. NBC then aired the first two and final two games of the Stanley Cup Finals, while Versus broadcast games three and four.

References

Stanley Cup playoffs
Playoffs, 2010

sv:National Hockey League 2009/2010#Slutspelet